Emiliano Alfaro Toscano (born 28 April 1988) is a Uruguayan retired professional footballer who played as a striker. Apart from his native country, he has also played club football in India, UAE, Argentina, Italy and Thailand. He is nicknamed El Picaro, meaning The Thief in Spanish language.

Club career

Liverpool Montevideo and loan to San Lorenzo
Alfaro started his  professional career with Montevideo club Liverpool at the age of 18, becoming a first-team regular at a young age. After slowly developing as a footballer, Alfaro became a regular scorer for Liverpool. His best period at the club was the 2009–10 Apertura tournament, when he scored 13 times in 15 league matches.

His excellent performances led him to be transferred on loan to the well known Argentine club San Lorenzo de Almagro. His time in Argentina was not particularly successful, as he only managed to score twice for San Lorenzo.

Alfaro returned to Liverpool, where he again became a regular goalscorer. His performances were strong enough to draw the attention of Óscar Tabárez, coach of the Uruguay national team, for whom Alfaro made his debut.

Lazio
His form also saw him attract interest from Europe, and on January 12, 2012, Alfaro moved to Italian Serie A club Lazio for a fee of 3 million euro. He chose the number 30 shirt, never before worn at Lazio. He ended the season by making 8 appearances in total without scoring any goal.

Al Wasl
On September 12, 2012 Alfaro was loaned to Al Wasl in the United Arab Emirates, with option to purchase value set at 3.5 million. He made his debut on September 18 in the UAE President's Cup, scoring two goals against Al-Ittihad Kalba SC. On September 23, 2012 he made his debut in the league, to mark the victory, 4–1, against Al-Wahda where he also scored a hat trick. After 33 appearances and 24 goals in total, he returned to Lazio.

Back to Liverpool
After spending the entire season of 2013–2014 in bench, on August 28, 2014 was loaned to his old club Liverpool Montevideo, the team that launched him in professional football. On 13 September he played first game of season against the Torque in which he also scored a goal, with the game ending 3–0 to Liverpool. In the next game against Central Español on 27 September, he scored a brace that allowed his team to win the game 3–1. On May 2, 2015, with a 2–1 victory against Cerro Largo, Liverpool earned the promotion to the Uruguayan Primera División. On the May 23 with the closing of the season, he became the top scorer of the championship with a total of 21 goals scored in 27 games played.

Thailand
At the end of the loan period Alfaro went back to Lazio, but at the end of the summer transfer market summer he was sold to Thailand champions Buriram United. Due to injuries sustained in pre-season he never played for Buriram United, and finally his contract was mutually terminated.

India
On 1 September 2016, Alfaro signed with Indian Super League franchise NorthEast United FC. On 5 October, he scored both the goals in a match against FC Goa, in which NorthEast United emerged victorious with 2–0 scoreline. He scored the first goal in the 20 minute, taking advantage of a failure of Goa goalkeeper Laxmikant Kattimani to clear a backpass by Lúcio. He scored the second goal in the 63rd minute from a Holicharan Narzary assist. Although he netted five times in his first seven matches, his form dipped since then as he failed to score any more goals in the remaining six matches.

After a stint with Emirati second tier club Al-Fujairah where he scored eight goals in 12 matches, Alfaro returned to the Indian Super League on 10 July 2017 and signed with FC Pune City; becoming the club's first foreign signing of the season. On 23 November, he made his debut in a 2–3 loss against Delhi Dynamos FC, scoring a goal in the 67th minute. Seven days later, he scored a brace against Mumbai City FC, which included the winning goal in the dying minute of the 2–1 victory.

On 18 November 2018, Alfaro joined ATK on a loan deal as a replacement for the injured Kalu Uche. On 20 November, he suffered an injury while training for his new club ATK. Eli Babalj was signed as a replacement of him.

Return to Liverpool and retirement
After joining his boyhood club Liverpool in July 2019, injuries regularly kept Alfaro out of action. He played 12 matches during the final stint for the club and scored a goal in 5–0 Copa Sudamericana win against Llaneros. On 21 March 2021, he announced retirement from professional football.

Career statistics
Details correct to 24 November 2018

International career
Alfaro first represented Uruguay at the 2005 South American Under-17 Football Championship held in Venezuela. The Uruguayans were runners-up to Brazil and qualified for the 2005 FIFA U-17 World Championship, which was hosted by Peru. Alfaro also played at the world championship, but Uruguay finished bottom of its group.

He then played with the Uruguayan under-20 team at the 2007 FIFA U-20 World Cup held in Canada alongside Edinson Cavani and Luis Suárez.

On November 7, 2011 he was named for a FIFA World Cup qualification match against Chile in Montevideo.

Alfaro made his senior international debut for Uruguay against Italy at the Stadio Olimpico in Rome on 15 November 2011.

Playing style
Alfaro is a striker, who plays mainly near the opponent's goal. Not being endowed with great technique, he makes tenacity, competitive spirit and opportunism three of his best qualities.

Personal life
Alfaro is of Italian heritage and holds an Italian passport, which allowed him to join Lazio as an EU player. His ancestors are from the Piedmontese town of Rorà, about 60 km southwest of Turin.

Honours

Club
Liverpool
Uruguayan Segunda División (1): 2014–15

Individual
 Top Scorer Uruguayan Segunda División  (1): 2014–15

References

External links
 
 

1988 births
Living people
People from Treinta y Tres
Uruguayan footballers
Uruguayan expatriate footballers
Uruguay international footballers
Uruguay under-20 international footballers
Uruguayan Primera División players
Argentine Primera División players
Serie A players
Liverpool F.C. (Montevideo) players
San Lorenzo de Almagro footballers
Club Olimpia footballers
S.S. Lazio players
Al-Wasl F.C. players
Fujairah FC players
NorthEast United FC players
FC Pune City players
ATK (football club) players
Expatriate footballers in Argentina
Expatriate footballers in Paraguay
Expatriate footballers in Italy
Expatriate footballers in the United Arab Emirates
Expatriate footballers in India
UAE First Division League players
UAE Pro League players
Indian Super League players
Association football forwards
Uruguayan expatriate sportspeople in India